Adventures in Preservation, formerly named Heritage Conservation Network, is a non-profit organization dedicated to safeguarding the world’s architectural heritage. Its programs give volunteers from all walks of life the opportunity to be involved in preservation in a variety of hands-on ways.

Overview 

Adventures in Preservation (AiP) is a non-profit organization revolving around “Heritage Travel with Purpose”. AiP connects people and preservation through hands-on programs that safeguard cultural heritage and foster community sustainability. AiP travelers have the opportunity to travel, experience their destination, and learn hands-on skills from experts while assisting communities in a meaningful way.

AiP organizes a series of hands-on building conservation workshops and volunteer vacations. Working in locations around the world, participants support community-based preservation projects, such as restoring houses to create affordable housing. The workshops are meaningful opportunities to give back while learning about preservation in general, as well as specific building conservation techniques.

Each workshop is led by a technical expert, who teaches and guides volunteers as they work. Participation is open to all, from teens to active retirees. Since its founding in 2001, Adventures in Preservation has worked in a half-dozen countries, including Albania, Slovenia, Mexico, Italy, Ghana, and the United States. Many other projects are in development. Requests for assistance come directly from people involved at the grass-roots level, and projects are put onto a wait list.

Global impact and recognition 
Numerous examples have shown that AiP’s volunteer efforts are a major catalyst for conservation. AiP volunteers have played a key role in restoration projects at the Francis Mill in Waynesville, North Carolina; the Weisel Bridge, Quakertown, Pennsylvania; Manor House in Oplotnica, Slovenia; the gardens of the Bartow-Pell Mansion Museum, The Bronx, New York; and adobe residences in Mesilla, New Mexico.

AiP also organized crews of volunteers in New Orleans, Louisiana, and Bay St. Louis, Mississippi, to help clean up in the aftermath of Hurricane Katrina.

AiP volunteers restore more than buildings. They restore people's lives, their communities, and their pride in their heritage. The workshops also contribute variously to heritage tourism, economic development, and job training initiatives.

The organization and its volunteers have received awards for their efforts at Bartow-Pell Mansion Museum and their emergency stabilization work at the James Brown House and Farm Ooltehwah, Tennessee.

view current projects at http://adventuresinpreservation.org/upcoming-adventures/

Workshops 
AiP adventures have always provided you a great educational experience, with hands-on training and excursions designed to highlight the essence of each country’s culture. AiP offers six to eight workshops each year. As with most volunteer travel programs, there is a fee for participating. This fee covers lodging, most meals, insurance, instructions, and a contribution towards the cost of conservation work and building materials. Current workshop offerings are listed on their website.

"Jammers" is a special term for the people who travel with AiP to explore and help restore the world's cultural heritage, because they are so much more than volunteers or participants. To make a long story short, "jammers" comes from an early misunderstanding that Adventures in Preservation worked with jam and jelly, as in strawberry and other fruit preserves. An interesting possibility, but not so. It represents the way a group of musicians, or other groups, come together to jam and create something new and wonderful.

References 
Adventures in Preservation
Francis Mill Preservation Society 
Facebook Page 
Nonprofit spotlight: Heritage Conservation Network
Colorado Daily: Your Town: Preserving the Past
History in Your Hands: Past Horizons Issue 1, pp. 22-23

External links 
 Adventures in Preservation

Historic preservation organizations in the United States
Charities based in Colorado
Conservation and restoration organizations